Three referendums were held in Liechtenstein during 1925. The first on 13 September was on the subject of the Lawena power plant and was approved by 56.1% of voters. The second and third were held on 13 December and concerned two proposals on civil order, the Gassner Initiative and a counterproposal from the Landtag. The Landtag's proposal was approved by 81.7% of voters, whilst the Gassner Initiative was rejected by 89.1%.

Results

Lawena power plant

Gassner Initiative

Landtag counterproposal on civil order

 The official figures for the two referendums in December are inconsistent and do not add up to the totals given.

References

1925 referendums
1925 in Liechtenstein
Referendums in Liechtenstein